Stolonica is a genus of ascidian tunicates in the family Styelidae.

Species within the genus Stolonica include:
 Stolonica agnata Kott, 1985 
 Stolonica aluta Kott, 1985 
 Stolonica australis Michaelsen, 1927 
 Stolonica bigyna Monniot & Monniot, 2001 
 Stolonica brevigastra Kott, 2003 
 Stolonica carnosa Millar, 1963 
 Stolonica conglutinata Sluiter, 1915 
 Stolonica diptycha (Hartmeyer, 1919) 
 Stolonica duploplicata Sluiter, 1913 
 Stolonica inhacae (Millar, 1956) 
 Stolonica laboutei (Monniot, 1988) 
 Stolonica laevis Monniot, 2002 
 Stolonica limbata Monniot & Monniot, 1996 
 Stolonica malayanus (Sluiter, 1915) 
 Stolonica michaelseni (Brewin, 1956)
 Stolonica multitestis Monniot, 2001 
 Stolonica nodula (Kott, 1985) 
 Stolonica paucigonas (Monniot & Monniot, 1984) 
 Stolonica prolifera Sluiter, 1905 
 Stolonica reducta (Sluiter, 1904) 
 Stolonica sabulosa Monniot, 1972 
 Stolonica schauinslandi (Michaelsen, 1922) 
 Stolonica sigma Tokioka, 1952 
 Stolonica socialis Hartmeyer, 1903 
 Stolonica truncata Kott, 1972 
 Stolonica variata Monniot, 1988 
 Stolonica vermiculata Kott, 2005 
 Stolonica vesicularis Van Name, 1918

Species names currently considered to be synonyms:
 Stolonica pacificus (Monniot & Monniot, 1991): synonym of Distomus pacificus Monniot & Monniot, 1991 
 Stolonica styeliformis Van Name, 1918: synonym of Stolonica duploplicata Sluiter, 1913 
 Stolonica variolosus (Gärtner in Pallas, 1774): synonym of Distomus variolosus Gaertner, 1774 
 Stolonica zorritensis Van Name, 1931: synonym of Polyandrocarpa zorritensis (Van Name, 1931)

References

Stolidobranchia
Tunicate genera